Noureddine Drioueche (born October 27, 1973 in Meftah, Blida Province) is an Algerian footballer. He currently plays as a defender for MC Saïda in the Algerian league.

Honours
 Won the CAF Cup three times with JS Kabylie in 2000, 2001 and 2002
 Won the Algerian league two times with JS Kabylie in 2004 and 2006
 Has 13 caps for the Algerian national team

External links
 DZFoot Profile

1973 births
Living people
People from Meftah
Algerian footballers
Algeria international footballers
JS Kabylie players
Expatriate footballers in Qatar
Algerian expatriate footballers
Al-Arabi SC (Qatar) players
USM El Harrach players
Algerian expatriate sportspeople in Qatar
MC Saïda players
Qatar Stars League players
JS Bordj Ménaïel players
Association football defenders
21st-century Algerian people